Arike Ogunbowale (born March 2, 1997) is an American professional basketball player for the Dallas Wings of the Women's National Basketball Association (WNBA). She played college basketball for the Notre Dame Fighting Irish, before being drafted by the Wings with the fifth overall pick of the 2019 WNBA draft. She was the Most Outstanding Player of Notre Dame's 2018 national title run, hitting game-winning baskets in both the semi-final and championship game.

Career

High school & earlier
Ogunbowale came out of the eighth grade at Our Redeemer Lutheran School in Wauwatosa, Wisconsin.  In her last year at Our Redeemer, Arike helped the Our Redeemer girls’ team win the national championship at the 2011 Tournament of Champions sponsored by the Lutheran Basketball Association of America.  She was named the MVP of the tournament.     

She went on to play high school basketball at Divine Savior Holy Angels High School (DSHA) in Milwaukee, Wisconsin. DSHA has long been known for its multiple national and state titles in numerous sports. Ogunbowale returned to DSHA on December 30, 2021 to be inducted into the Hall of Fame there. In the 2014–2015 season, the team won the Wisconsin Interscholastic Athletic Association Division I title, with Ogunbowale averaging 27.2 points per game. She scored 55 points in a semi-final game against an undefeated team. Ogunbowale was ranked ninth in the world, named 2015 Wisconsin Miss Basketball and was a McDonald's High School All-America selection.

College
Ogunbowale averaged 11.4 points per game in her freshman season at Notre Dame as a reserve player, and became a regular starter the next year.

In her junior season, Ogunbowale helped the Fighting Irish win the 2018 NCAA Division I women's basketball tournament, making game-winning baskets in the semifinal against UConn and in the final against Mississippi State. Shortly after the end of the 2017–18 school year, the Atlantic Coast Conference named her as its female Athlete of the Year across all sports, sharing honors with men's winner Lamar Jackson of Louisville football.

In her next and final season at Notre Dame, she again helped them to the final of the NCAA tournament but this time, despite contributing 31 points through that match and a tournament average of 22.8 points, she missed 1 of 2 free throws in the final seconds against Baylor, with her miss providing the final 1-point margin.

Professional
Ogunbowale was the fifth overall pick in the 2019 WNBA draft by the Dallas Wings.
Ogunbowale was selected as the WNBA 2021 All-Star Game Most Valuable Player (MVP) with 26 points in the team WNBA win versus the women's Olympic squad, Team USA (July 14, 2021).
During the 2019 season, she was third in the league in scoring, averaging 19.1 points per game. She scored 20 or more points in 13 of her final 14 games, including the final 11 of the season. After the season, Ogunbowale was named to the All-Rookie Team.

Personal life
Ogunbowale was born in Milwaukee to Nigerian parents Yolanda and Gregory Ogunbowale. She is the youngest of three children. She is of Yoruba descent and her name ”Arike” means a child you treasure, cherish, pamper and love in the Yoruba language. Her father served in the Nigerian military while her mother Yolanda played softball at DePaul University and her brother Dare played football at the University of Wisconsin and is a running back for the Houston Texans. She is also a cousin of basketball player Diamond Stone. From 2009 to 2012, Ogunbowale was part of four Division One Wisconsin State High School Champions soccer teams.

In April 2018, Ogunbowale was announced as one of the celebrities who would compete on season 26 of Dancing with the Stars. She was partnered with professional dancer Gleb Savchenko. Ogunbowale and Savchenko were eliminated from the competition on May 7, 2018, placing 7th.

Career statistics

WNBA

Regular season

|-
| style="text-align:left;"| 2019
| style="text-align:left;"| Dallas
| 33 || 28 || 32.1 || .388 || .352 || .815 || 2.4 || 3.2 || 1.1 || 0.0 || 2.1 || 19.1
|-
| style="text-align:left;"| 2020
| style="text-align:left;"| Dallas
| style="background:#d3d3d3;"|22° || style="background:#d3d3d3;"|22° || 34.0 || .412 || .336 || .856 || 2.8 || 3.4 || 1.6 || 0.0 || 2.1 || style="background:#d3d3d3;"|22.8°
|-
| style="text-align:left;"| 2021
| style="text-align:left;"| Dallas
| 32 || 32 || 31.3 || .383 || .376 || .864 || 3.2 || 3.3 || 1.1 || 0.0 || 2.1 || 18.7
|-
| style="text-align:left;"| 2022
| style="text-align:left;"| Dallas
| 30 || 30 || 31.4 || .400 || .352 || .798 || 3.3 || 3.6 || 1.5 || 0.1 || 1.8 ||19.7
|-
| style="text-align:left;"| Career
| style="text-align:left;"|4 years, 1 team
| 117 || 112 || 32.1 || .395 || .355 || .832 || 2.9 || 3.4 || 1.2 || 0.0 || 2.0 || 19.8

Postseason

|-
| style="text-align:left;"| 2021
| style="text-align:left;"| Dallas
| 1 || 1 || 35.0 || .500 || .500 || .500 || 2.0 || 2.0 || 1.0 || 0.0 || 1.0 || 22.0
|-
| style="text-align:left;"| 2022
| style="text-align:left;"| Dallas
| 1 || 0 || 6.0 || .000 || .000 || – || 0.0 || 0.0 || 0.0 || 0.0 || 0.0 || 0.0
|-
| style="text-align:left;"| Career
| style="text-align:left;"| 2 years, 1 team
| 2 || 1 || 41.0 || .421 || .417 || .500 || 2.0 || 2.0 || 1.0 || 0.0 || 1.0 || 22.0

College

Source: College statistics courtesy of NCAA Statistics

References

External links
 
 
 
 
 
 Arike Paulina Ogunbowale at the Turkish Basketball Federation 

1997 births
Living people
All-American college women's basketball players
American people of Yoruba descent
American sportspeople of Nigerian descent
American women's basketball players
Basketball players at the 2014 Summer Youth Olympics
Basketball players from Milwaukee
Dallas Wings draft picks
Dallas Wings players
McDonald's High School All-Americans
Notre Dame Fighting Irish women's basketball players
Point guards
Women's National Basketball Association All-Stars
Yoruba sportswomen
Youth Olympic gold medalists for the United States